Hopewell Presbyterian Church may refer to:

 Hopewell Presbyterian Church (Hopewell, Johnson County, Indiana), listed on the NRHP in Johnson County, Indiana
 Hopewell Presbyterian Church (Oxford, Mississippi), listed on the NRHP in Lafayette County, Mississippi
 Hopewell Presbyterian Church (Crawford, New York), listed on the NRHP in New York
 Hopewell Presbyterian Church and Cemetery, Huntersville, North Carolina, NRHP-listed
 Hopewell Presbyterian Church and Hopewell Cemetery, Florence, South Carolina, NRHP-listed